The men's hammer throw event at the 2002 Asian Athletics Championships was held in Colombo, Sri Lanka on 10 August.

Results

References

2002 Asian Athletics Championships
Hammer throw at the Asian Athletics Championships